Felipe de Neve Branch Library is a branch library of the Los Angeles Public Library located in Lafayette Park in Westlake, Los Angeles. It was built in 1929 based on a Mediterranean Revival-Classical Revival design by architect Austin Whittlesey. The branch was named after Felipe de Neve, the Spanish governor of California who oversaw the founding of Los Angeles.  The branch was opened on Felipe de Neve Day in 1929, celebrating the 148th anniversary of the founding of Los Angeles.

The Felipe de Neve Branch was designated a Historic-Cultural Monument by the Los Angeles Cultural Heritage Commission in January 1984. In 1987, the De Neve Branch and several other branch libraries in Los Angeles were added to the National Register of Historic Places as part of a thematic group submission. The application noted that the branch libraries had been constructed in a variety of period revival styles to house the initial branch library system of the City of Los Angeles. With respect to the De Neve Branch, the application described the building as a one-story Mediterranean style brick building with a red tile roof. The street elevation is elaborately decorated with symmetrically arranged groupings of windows and black and white tile decorations in the shape of diamonds and crosses. The seal of the city made of mosaic tile is above the front doors. A horseshoe-shaped cast stone border of a floral design surrounds the top of the seal and doors.

See also

 National Register of Historic Places listings in Los Angeles
 List of Los Angeles Historic-Cultural Monuments in the Wilshire and Westlake areas
 Los Angeles Public Library

References

External links
 Felipe de Neve Branch - Los Angeles Public Library
 History of the Felipe de Neve Branch Library 1929-1988
 July 1929 Newspaper article on naming of Felipe De Neve Branch
 August 1929 Newspaper article on dedication ceremonies for Felipe De Neve Branch
 Flyer explaining the symbolism of the Hollow Wall Diptych at the Felipe de Neve Branch Library

Library buildings completed in 1929
Libraries in Los Angeles
Libraries on the National Register of Historic Places in Los Angeles
Los Angeles Historic-Cultural Monuments
Public libraries in California
Mediterranean Revival architecture in California
Neoclassical architecture in California
Westlake, Los Angeles